Vasudev Sunil Kumar (born 15 August 1975) is an Indian politician who is the current Minister of Kannada and Culture and the Energy Department of Karnataka from 4 August 2021. He is the member of the legislative assembly from Bharatiya Janata Party representing Karkala constituency. Before he served as Chief Whip of BJP Government in Karnataka Legislative Assembly.  In November 2020, he was appointed the Co-Incharge of BJP in Kerala.

Political career
Sunil Kumar started his political career as a leader of the student wing of the RSS, the Akhil Bharatiya Vidyarthi Parishad. Later he joined Bharatiya Janata Party in the year 2004.

In the 2004 Karnataka Legislative Assembly election he contested against the incumbent member H. Gopal Bhandary of Indian National Congress and he was elected to Karnataka Legislative Assembly from Karkala constituency for the first time. He defeated Congress candidate by a margin of over 10000 votes. . Kumar lost the seat to H. Gopal Bhandary in the 2008 Karnataka Legislative Assembly election by a narrow margin of 1537 votes.
Kumar later contested Udupi-Chikmagalur Loksabha by-election in 2012. The seat was vacated after D. V. Sadananda Gowda became Chief Minister of Karnataka. He lost by huge margin against K. Jayaprakash Hegde of Congress. Kumar was elected as MLA from Karkala Constituency in 2013 Karnataka Legislative Assembly election by defeating H. Gopal Bhandary by over 4000 votes. Currently he is serving as the chief Whip of ruling party in Karnataka government.

He was re-elected as the MLA from Karkala Constituency by defeating H. Gopal Bhandary for the 3rd time with a margin of 42566 votes on 15 May 2018. In November 2020, he was appointed Co-incharge of BJP Kerala by party president Jagat Prakash Nadda.

When BJP formed government under B.S.Yediyurappa in 2019, it was highly expected that Sunil Kumar will be made cabinet minister but his name was missing. His name was again ignored during cabinet expansion in January 2021. Sunil Kumar wrote a letter to State BJP Party president Nalin Kumar Kateel expressing displeasure.

He was later sworn-in as a cabinet minister, under Basavaraj Bommai and was given the Energy ministry, with additional Kannada and cultural development portfolio in August 2021.

Personal life

Sunil Kumar married Priyanka & they have 3 children.

References 

Living people
People from Chikkamagaluru district
Bharatiya Janata Party politicians from Karnataka
Karnataka MLAs 2004–2007
1975 births
Karnataka MLAs 2018–2023